Wang Zhelin (pronounced ; born January 20, 1994) is a Chinese basketball player for the Shanghai Sharks in the Chinese Basketball Association. He was drafted in Round 2 (Number 57 overall) in the 2016 NBA Draft by the Memphis Grizzlies.

Professional career
Wang Zhelin first gained recognition in March 2012 when he was selected to the Chinese national team's preliminary squad for the 2012 Summer Olympics though he did not make the final squad. In April 2012, Wang was chosen to play at the Nike Hoop Summit and he impressed many by scoring 19 points, 8 rebounds, and blocking 2 shots in an 84–75 victory against the U.S. men's junior select team. This was the best all-time performance by any Chinese player in the Nike Hoop Summit.

Fujian Sturgeons (2012–2021) 
Wang then signed his first professional contract with the Fujian Sturgeons of the Chinese Basketball Association in June 2012, prior to the 2012–13 season. In his first professional season, Wang averaged 20.3 points and 12.9 rebounds per game for Fujian. His second season with Fujian saw him put up a career-high 22.8 points per game. His injury-derailed fourth season saw him produce career-low averages of 10 points, 6 rebounds and 0.4 blocks in 21.3 minutes of average action.

Wang was selected late in the second round of the 2016 NBA draft by the Memphis Grizzlies as the 57th pick. Fellow countryman Zhou Qi was selected with the 43rd pick by the Houston Rockets, the second time two Chinese prospects were selected in an NBA draft (the first time being in 2007 with Yi Jianlian and Sun Yue). However, Wang would not immediately join the Grizzlies, instead returning with Fujian for the following season to develop. While Wang would regain some of his abilities that made him a viable NBA draft pick in the first place, he would remain in Fujian for at least another season.

In 2018, he played in the 2018 NBA Summer League as a member of the China men's national basketball team. In the first game, the Chinese team lost to the Indiana Pacers by a score of 56-36. In the second game, Wang faced off against fellow Chinese player Zhou Qi and the Houston Rockets, losing 78-66.

In the third game, Wang scored six points in the Chinese team's 73-72 loss to the Sacramento Kings. In the fourth game, the China men's national basketball team won its first game, 68-42, against the Washington Wizards. Wang did not play in this game due to illness. In the last game, the China team beat  the Detroit Pistons by a score of 66-62. In this series, China won two games and lost three games, but Wang did not play all of these games due to illness.

In 2018-2019 CBA regular season, Wang reached career high of 25.7 PPG and 13.9 RPG on 54% shooting and led his team to the 2nd round of the CBA playoffs.  Wang also received the 2018-2019 CBA Regular season MVP for this first time.

On September 10, 2021, Wang's NBA draft rights were traded to the Los Angeles Lakers for Marc Gasol, a 2024 secondround pick, and cash. 

On January 3, 2022 his draft rights were moved again, to the New York Knicks, as part of a three-team deal with the Lakers and Cleveland.

National team career
Wang played for the Chinese national team at the 2015 FIBA Asia Championship played in China. Coming off the bench, he participated in China's romp to the title and qualification for the 2016 Olympics.

In 2018, Wang played games with 2018 NBA Summer League teams as a member of the China men's national basketball team. In the first game, the China men's national basketball team lost 36-56 against the Indiana Pacers.

In the second game, Wang played against fellow Chinese national team member Houston Rockets named Zhou Qi, and the China men's national basketball team lost 66-78 against the Houston Rockets.

In the third game, Wang scored three points and the China men's national basketball team lost 72-73 against the Sacramento Kings.

In the fourth game, the China men's national basketball team earned their first win of the summer, a 68-42 triumph over the Washington Wizards. Wang did not play in this game due to illness.

In the last game of the series, China won 66–62 against the Detroit Pistons.

In August 2018, he played for China at the Asian Games. In the first game, China won 82-80, and Wang scored 13 points. In the end, he helped China win the 2018 Asian Games.

Wang was included in China's squad for the 2023 FIBA Basketball World Cup qualification.

Career statistics

CBA

References

1994 births
Living people
Basketball players at the 2014 Asian Games
Basketball players at the 2016 Summer Olympics
Basketball players from Fujian
Centers (basketball)
Chinese men's basketball players
Basketball players at the 2018 Asian Games
Fujian Sturgeons players
Memphis Grizzlies draft picks
Olympic basketball players of China
Sportspeople from Fujian
Asian Games gold medalists for China
Asian Games medalists in basketball
Medalists at the 2018 Asian Games
2019 FIBA Basketball World Cup players